A Twenty20 International (T20I) is a form of cricket match between two representative teams, each having T20I status as determined by the International Cricket Council (ICC), and is played under the rules of Twenty20 cricket. The first such match was played between Australia and New Zealand on 17 February 2005. The Indian cricket team played its first T20I match—under the captaincy of Virender Sehwag—during the 2006–07 series in South Africa; India defeated the hosts by six wickets in the one-off match and claimed the series.

As of 5 January 2023, 102 players have represented India in T20Is. India won the inaugural edition of the ICC World Twenty20, defeating Pakistan in the final by five runs.

Key

Players
The list is arranged in the order in which each player won his first cap. To sort this table by any statistic, click on the  icon on the column title.
Last updated 1 February 2023.

T20I captains

Notes

References 

Twenty20 International
India